Sanda Thudamma (Arakanese:စန္ဒသုဓမ္မရာဇာ, or islamized name Saad Ummadar), was 24th king of the Mrauk U Kingdom. He reigned from 1652 to 1674. He lost the control of Chittagong during his reign. 

The famous Bengali poet Syed Alaol was the poet in his court. He translated Tohfa at the request of Shrichondro Sudhormo or Sanda Thudhamma.

Reign 
Prince ascended to the throne after death of his father, Thado in 1652.

In 1664, Sanda Thudamma had to cede large amounts of his territories due to an invasion by Mughal Emperor Aurangzeb. In 1666, another invasion by Shaista Khan captured the port of Chittagong. Chittagong remained a key port throughout Mughal rule.

References

Bibliography

See also
 Mrauk U Kingdom
 History of Rakhine

Thudhamma
1684 deaths
17th century in Burma
17th-century Burmese monarchs